Amos Jones (born December 31, 1959) is an American football coach who is the assistant coach of special projects & situations for the New York Giants of the National Football League (NFL).

College playing career
Jones played safety and running back at the University of Alabama, under Bear Bryant. He graduated from Alabama with his bachelor's degree in 1982, and later earned a master's degree from Alabama.

Coaching career
Jones began his NFL coaching career as an assistant special teams coach for the Pittsburgh Steelers. He was hired on January 29, 2007. He worked under special teams coach Bob Ligashesky and head coach Mike Tomlin. He had previously worked with Tomlin as well as former Steelers offensive line coach Larry Zierlein in the late 1990s at the University of Cincinnati. Other connections with the Steelers staff included serving under (former) offensive coordinator Bruce Arians when he was head coach at Temple in the 1980s and playing and coaching at Alabama during the late 1970s and early 1980s when Steelers assistant head coach John Mitchell served at the Tide's defensive line coach.

Prior to joining the Steelers, Jones had coached football for 26 years—four seasons at the high school level; 21 seasons at the college level at Alabama, Temple, Pitt, Tulane, Cincinnati, James Madison, and Mississippi State; and a single year with the Canadian Football League's BC Lions.

Jones was retained by the Steelers as assistant special teams coach when Ligashesky was replaced by Al Everest as the Steelers' special teams coordinator in 2010. When Everest was fired by the team just prior to the 2012 season, Jones took over responsibility for all of the special teams. In 2013 Jones was hired by the Arizona Cardinals.

Personal life
Jones grew up in Aliceville, Alabama. He is a 1978 graduate of Pickens Academy, a private school in Carrollton, Alabama.  He was baptized in the Southern Baptist faith on the same day as his father.

Jones and his wife Stacey (formerly Stacey Merkle) have four children. Their oldest daughter and son attended the University of Alabama on the Bear Bryant Scholarship and graduated from the establishment in 2011 and 2015, respectively. The family makes their off-season home on a farm in Pickens County, Alabama, located between Aliceville and Carrollton.

References

1959 births
Living people
American football running backs
American football safeties
Alabama Crimson Tide football players
Alabama Crimson Tide football coaches
Arizona Cardinals coaches
BC Lions coaches
Cincinnati Bearcats football coaches
James Madison Dukes football coaches
Mississippi State Bulldogs football coaches
Pittsburgh Panthers football coaches
Pittsburgh Steelers coaches
Players of American football from Tallahassee, Florida
Temple Owls football coaches
Tulane Green Wave football coaches
High school football coaches in Alabama
High school football coaches in Florida
High school football coaches in Louisiana
People from Aliceville, Alabama
People from Carrollton, Alabama
Baptists from Alabama
New York Giants coaches
Tampa Bay Buccaneers coaches
Cleveland Browns coaches